The Lukens Main Office Building is an historic office building which is located in Coatesville, Chester County, Pennsylvania, USA. 

It was added to the National Register of Historic Places in 1976.

History and architectural features
The original section of this structure was designed by the architectural firm of Cope & Stewardson and built in 1902, for the Lukens Steel Company. It is a two-and-one-half-story, seven-bay, brick, "T"-shaped building in a Colonial Revival/Georgian Revival style. It has a hipped roof with dormers and flanking two-story, three-bay wings. 

A duplicate of the original structure was added in 1916, making it an "H"-shaped building. The addition was designed by the successor firm of Page & Stewardson. 

Today, the building is home to the National Iron & Steel Heritage Museum and other local businesses and organizations.

It was added to the National Register of Historic Places in 1976.

References

External links
National Iron & Steel Heritage Museum website

History museums in Pennsylvania
Commercial buildings on the National Register of Historic Places in Pennsylvania
Colonial Revival architecture in Pennsylvania
Georgian Revival architecture in Pennsylvania
Buildings and structures completed in 1916
Museums in Chester County, Pennsylvania
Coatesville, Pennsylvania
National Register of Historic Places in Chester County, Pennsylvania
Historic district contributing properties in Pennsylvania